Marvis Linwood "Bootsy" Thornton III (born July 30, 1977) is an American former professional basketball player.

After graduation from St. John's University, where he played for two years, Thornton moved to Italy, where he made a name for himself over the following decade. Thornton spent his most successful years with Montepaschi Siena for which he played on three occasions, winning as many national championship titles and being an All-EuroLeague Second Team selection in 2008.

High school
Thornton played basketball at Paul Laurence Dunbar High School, in Baltimore, Maryland.

College career
Thornton will forever have a place in St. John's Red Storm lore, thanks to his 40-point performance against Duke on January 24, 1999, including seven three-pointers.

Professional career
A highly versatile shooting guard, Thornton earned an All-EuroLeague Second Team selection in the 2007–08 season. On August 8, 2012, Thornton signed with Dinamo Sassari. On December 25, 2013, he signed with Strasbourg IG for the rest of the season.

References

External links
 Bootsy Thornton at acb.com 
 Bootsy Thornton at euroleague.net
 Bootsy Thornton at legabasket.it 
 Bootsy Thornton at lnb.fr 
 Bootsy Thornton at tblstat.net

1977 births
Living people
21st-century African-American sportspeople
African-American basketball players
American expatriate basketball people in France
American expatriate basketball people in Italy
American expatriate basketball people in Spain
American expatriate basketball people in Turkey
American men's basketball players
Anadolu Efes S.K. players
Basketball players from Baltimore
CB Girona players
Dinamo Sassari players
FC Barcelona Bàsquet players
Liga ACB players
Mens Sana Basket players
Pallacanestro Cantù players
Shooting guards
St. John's Red Storm men's basketball players
SIG Basket players
Tallahassee Eagles men's basketball players
20th-century African-American sportspeople